Myxidium is a genus of cnidarians belonging to the family Myxidiidae.

The genus has cosmopolitan distribution.

Species:
 Myxidium acinum Hine, 1975 
 Myxidium adriaticum Lubat, Radujkovic, Marques & Bouix, 1989

References

Myxidiidae
Cnidarian genera